Rozivka Raion was a former raion (districts) of Zaporizhzhia Oblast in southern Ukraine. The administrative center of the region was the urban-type settlement of Rozivka. The raion was abolished on 18 July 2020 as part of the administrative reform of Ukraine, which reduced the number of raions of Zaporizhzhia Oblast to five. The area of Rozivka Raion was merged into Polohy Raion.

On 19 April 2022, during the 2022 Russian invasion of Ukraine, a town hall assembly was reportedly organized in Russian-occupied Rozivka, where a majority of attendees (mainly seniors) voted by hand to join the separatist DPR. This came despite two major issues. The first being that the raion is outside the Donetsk Oblast and therefore outside the borders claimed by the DPR and its leadership. The second being that the raion hadn't existed for over two years at the time of the vote. Locals claimed the vote was rigged and that organizers threatened anyone voting against with arrest and since the vote the town has been De facto governed by the DPR.

References

Former raions of Zaporizhzhia Oblast
1992 establishments in Ukraine
Ukrainian raions abolished during the 2020 administrative reform